Ian Taylor (born 23 May 1948) is a Scottish former footballer, who played for Aberdeen, Motherwell and St Johnstone. A left winger, he had a 12-year career in the Scottish Football League, making 195 league appearances.now lives in Prestatyn north Wales with second wife Hilary taylor

References

1948 births
Living people
Footballers from Aberdeen
Scottish footballers
Association football wingers
Banks O' Dee F.C. players
Aberdeen F.C. players
Motherwell F.C. players
St Johnstone F.C. players
Elgin City F.C. players
Scottish Football League players